Riboldi is a surname. Notable people with the surname include:

Agostino Gaetano Riboldi (1839–1902), Italian Roman Catholic cardinal 
Antonio Riboldi (1923–2017), Italian Roman Catholic bishop
Penelope Riboldi (born 1986), Italian footballer

Italian-language surnames